The Lotus Elise GT1 (also known as the Lotus GT1 and known internally as Type-115) is a race car developed for grand tourer-style sports car racing starting in 1997.

Development
Lotus Cars had previously been using the Lotus Esprit GT1 –a racing version of their Lotus Esprit road car– in the BPR Global GT Series since its foundation in 1994, competing in the premiere GT1 class against the likes of the McLaren F1 GTR, Venturi 600LM, Ferrari F40 GTE and others. However, in 1997, the series came to be known as the FIA GT Championship and manufacturer involvement was increased with the new international exposure. Porsche was the first to start a new breed of racing cars in 1996, with their purpose-built homologation special known as the 911 GT1. This was quickly followed by the announcement that Mercedes-Benz planned to do the same with their CLK GTR for 1997.

Thus Lotus decided that in order to remain competitive in the GT1 class, it would be required to follow the route set forth by Porsche and Mercedes-Benz. However, the company management was aware that they lacked the resources available that Porsche and Mercedes had to create not only the race cars but also the street legal variants. Therefore at a guaranteed loss of money for the company, Lotus decided to take an alternate route- making a single road version of their new race car.

With this in mind, Lotus set about to develop their racing car. Lotus decided to abandon the aged Esprit chassis and instead turn to its new sports car, the Elise.

Lotus knew that the Elise's inline-4 engine would not be competitive so it was initially decided that the car would use the 3.5 L V8 engine from the Esprit sports car. However, testing showed that the engine was not as reliable as hoped. After installation of it in the road car, Lotus teams were left to decide whether or not to use the Lotus V8 or opt for a Chevrolet 5.7 L V8 engine from the Chevrolet Corvette, a car which Lotus had jointly developed when they had been under the ownership of General Motors. Lotus further developed the Chevrolet engine by fitting it with a carbon intake, developing a dry sump system. Initialy it was a aluminium engine block, which proved to be problematic, later they decided to change to a cast-iron block.
 L for the Elise GT1 Race car. Seven Elise GT1 racing chassis were built, going to factory teams GT1 Lotus Racing (run by Fabien Giroix's First Racing) as well as privateers GBF UK and Martin Veyhle Racing. The factory GT1 Lotus Racing team would be the only ones to opt for the Chevrolet V8 instead of the Lotus twin-turbocharged unit.

Performance
Only the factory cars had the Chevrolet V8 engine and the road version had the Type 918 V8 with the former proving to be more problematic. The race cars were initially fitted with a Hewland 6-speed sequential manual transmission, although multiple other transmissions were used during their life span. The road version was fitted with a Renault 5-speed manual transmission. Even with such performance figures, the car wasn't able to match the performance of its competitors at LeMans and would see a dreadful fate.

Racing history
Debuting at Hockenheim, on 13 April (first round of the 1997 FIA GT Championship season), the three factory Elise GT1s and the privateer GBF car took to the grid. Their debut was short lived, as all four cars failed to finish, all due to alternator problems in the engine. For race two (Silverstone, 11 May), privateer GBF UK received their second car (an untested chassis bearing number 06 driven by Andrea Boldrini and Mauro Martini). Again the three factory cars suffered, failing to finish because of gearbox difficulty. GBF's Elise GT1s fared slightly better, with one of their entries actually finishing, although classified last and 25 laps down from the winner.

The third race of the season in Helsinki was a shorter race, featuring a smaller field (23 cars). Only three Elise GT1s were entered, but GBF was able to succeed in taking 5th place, earning them points in the championship. The other two Elise GT1s also finished the race as well, an improvement for the company.

As the season progressed, the teams began to suffer. After Helsinki was the 24 Hours of Le Mans, in which only a lone GT1 was entered due to concern over the car's ability to last 24 hours. The car had an oil pump failure after 121 laps. Returning to the FIA championship at the Nürburgring, the full complement of five cars managed a best result of only 11th, while at Spa they achieved 8th, but at Zeltweg all five cars failed to finish again. The teams did not attempt the Suzuka round and again could only earn 12th place at Donington and 11th at Mugello when the series returned to Europe. The final two races in the United States saw only the factory team bring two cars, with US prepared NASCAR 5.7 ltr Chevrolet engines with 2 valves 1 cam and a cast iron block, to overcome the previous engine failures. They managed to finish on a 13th and 9th-place. The factory squad ended the season without any points, while GBF's points finish at Helsinki earned them 8th place in the championship.

Following the 1997 season, Lotus and its parent company, Proton, decided that the GT1 was not only lacking in pace in comparison to Porsche, Mercedes-Benz and the older McLarens, but that it was also extremely expensive. The Chevrolet V8 was not a custom built race engine like its competitors, leaving it lacking in top speed while the Lotus twin-turbocharged V8 was faring even worse. The chassis was also too similar to a production car to compete with the exotic designs of other cars. The project was therefore cancelled and the factory team folded. The privateer teams also either folded or bought more capable cars.

Miraculously, in 2003 British squad Team Elite announced plans to purchase the Elise GT1 chassis #05 and to use in the 12 Hours of Sebring and 24 Hours of Le Mans in 2004 as a closed cockpit Le Mans prototype. This was similar to a plan by Panoz and French squad Larbre Compétition to use a Panoz Esperante GTR-1, a car which had originally competed with the Elise GT1 in FIA GT in 1997, as a closed cockpit prototype as well. The Elise would be modified to meet modern regulations as well as to attempt to bring the seven-year-old car up to speed. At Sebring, the car proved its age, lasting a mere seven laps before its transmission failed. The project was promptly cancelled.

Road version
Because Lotus planned on continuing to compete in FIA GT Championship, they decided to build a new race car for the 1997 season, due to Esprit GT1 not being powerful enough to compete with other GT1 race cars like Porsche 911 GT1, Mercedes CLK GTR and McLaren F1. Lotus was aware of the fact that they lacked enough budget to produce multiple road versions of the GT1, so they came up with another plan. Through interpretation of the rules for FIA GT, Lotus realized they would only need to build a single production car in order to meet homologation requirements. The car would not even need to be sold to a customer, it merely had to be built.

Mechanically, Lotus Elise S1's aluminum chassis was retained for the GT1, although it was heavily modified from its standard form. A new carbon fibre/ kevlar body that resembled the Elise was built, featuring a much longer length and a bigger width in order to increase the car's aerodynamic capabilities. The dimensions of the GT1 were now these: the overall length was now 4510 mm, and the overall width was 2070 mm. Width of the front axle was 2000 mm, same with the rear axle. The front overhang was 940mm and the rear was 895 mm. Wheelbase is approximately 2675 mm. All of these measurements were made from the center of the car. The weight of the car was around 1050 kg, a little heavier than its track-focused counterparts. 

The road version of the GT1 was fitted with a water-cooled 3.5 L 4-stroke Lotus Type 918 Garrett twin-turbocharged V8 engine with a power output of 550 PS (542 HP) at 6,500 RPM, attached to the Renault 5-speed manual transmission. The Lotus V8 engine was proven to be unreliable, so in the process, the racing team decided to put the GM's Chevrolet Corvette V8 engine in the factory track-focused race cars. The car was also fitted with a double wishbone suspension on both front and rear and an aluminum roll cage that was bolted down to the chassis.

, it is difficult to say where exactly the road version GT1 is. Last time it was seen in public was almost 10 years ago, at the Le Mans Classic. According to some sources it's still owned by Lotus and stored in a warehouse in England, but some say it could have ended up in the hands of some private collector in Netherlands.

Additional information

Type 918
 Position and location of the engine: behind the driver, central rear longitudinal
 Cycle: 4-stroke
 Turbos: Garrett 
 Number and layout of cylinders: V8 (90 deg)
 Type of cooling: Water
 Cylinder block material: Aluminum 
 Angle between intake valve and vertical: 21° 30' to bore centre-line
 Angle between exhaust valve and vertical: 20° 30' to bore centre-line 
 Camshaft location: over-head DOHC (2/head)
 Intake: 2 valves per cylinder
 Exhaust: 2 valves per cylinder

Renault Manual Gearbox
 Location: behind engine- longitudinal 
 Number of teeth: 
 1st gear- 11/37
 2nd gear- 17/35
 3rd gear- 21/29
 4th gear- 27/28
 5th gear- 41/31
 Reverse- 11/39
 Shift gear ratio:
 1st gear- 3.36
 2nd gear- 2.06
 3rd gear- 1.38
 4th gear- 1.04
 5th gear- 0.76
 Reverse- 3.54
Type of gearbox lubrication is wet sump-oil.

Final drive
 Type: spiral bevel
 Number of teeth: 9/35
 Shift gear ratio: 3.89
Type of lubrication is wet sump-oil.

Date of homologation: April 1, 1997
End of homologation: December 31, 2004

Bitter GT1

Former factory driver Mike Hezemans of the Netherlands, feeling that the Elise GT1's main faults were in its power and aerodynamics, decided that the car should not be abandoned and convinced his father Toine Hezemans to provide financial help in his project. The pair bought two former Elise GT1 chassis abandoned by the factory along with their inventory of parts. Hezemans and his small team consisting of chief mechanic Hans Willemsen and two mechanics, Peter Classen and Mario van Beek, set out to eliminate the known faults in the car. They took the chassis to the Netherlands and in their small workshop, the car was extensively reworked. The front end was made longer and smoother in an attempt to increase front downforce. The engine was fitted in the car by extending the chassis. The Hewland gearbox was retained as the team had a small budget. The new cars were promised to compete in the 1998 FIA GT Championship season. In order to make the cars compliant to the regulations of the FIA, Hezemans turned to his friend Erich Bitter who was an independent German car manufacturer. He agreed to give the cars his firm's name and the car were named Bitter GT1s.

The cars never matched even the lackluster performance of the original Elise GT1s. The only race in which they actually competed, Silverstone, saw both Bitters failing to finish, as the torque produced by the new V10 engine was too much for the gearbox. The original Hewland gearbox would be replaced with a unit from Gemini Transmission but after failing to even get past initial practice at the next race at Hockenheimring, the project was cancelled.

One Bitter GT1 has survived to this day, which is still currently in the ownership of the Hezemans family. The car has been restored to its original 1998 specification by NASCAR Whelen Euro Series team Hendriks Motorsport and was shaken down on January 2021 at TT Circuit Assen by Toine's son Loris Hezemans.

References

External links

 Supercars.net - Elise GT1
 Bitter Cars - Bitter GT1 (Link is broken, 21 March 2017)

Grand tourer racing cars
Elise GT1
24 Hours of Le Mans race cars